Gato or Gatoh is a surname that may refer to
Enrique Gato (born 1977), Spanish filmmaker
Idalmis Gato (born 1971), Cuban Olympic volleyball player
Manuel Gato (born 1984), Spanish association football player
Ramón Gato (born 1973), Cuban Olympic volleyball player
Shoji Gatoh (born 1971), Japanese author